Once Upon a Time is an American fairy tale drama television series created by Edward Kitsis and Adam Horowitz, who also serve as executive producers alongside Steve Pearlman. The series begins by introducing a bail bondswoman, Emma Swan (Jennifer Morrison) and her birth-son, Henry Mills (Jared S. Gilmore), who discover that a town named Storybrooke in Maine is a remnant of a parallel fantasy world that was cursed by Henry's adoptive mother, the Evil Queen/Mayor Regina Mills (Lana Parrilla), and that all the characters from the fairy tales have no memories of who they were, including Emma's parents, Snow White/Mary Margaret Blanchard (Ginnifer Goodwin) and Prince Charming/David Nolan (Josh Dallas), who sent her to the real world to save their world and break the curse.

Series overview

Episodes

Season 1 (2011–12)

Season 2 (2012–13)

Season 3 (2013–14)

Season 4 (2014–15)

Season 5 (2015–16)

Season 6 (2016–17)

Season 7 (2017–18)

Specials

Home media releases

Ratings

References

External links

 
Lists of American drama television series episodes
Lists of American fantasy television series episodes